Ras Daniel Heartman (7 January 1942 – 1990), born Lloyd George Roberts, was a Jamaican artist and religious leader. He is considered to be one of the most recognised artists in the Rastafarian art movement, his drawings were widely distributed around the world as prints and he designed a number of well-known reggae album covers in the 1960s and 1970s.

Born in Kingston, Jamaica, he grew up in the tough Whitfield Town area. Heartman featured in the 1972 film The Harder They Come playing the part of Pedro, the best friend of Jimmy Cliff's character Ivan.

Heartman emigrated to Tanzania in East Africa, where he died in Arusha, aged 47.

References

1942 births
1989 deaths
Jamaican Rastafarians
Jamaican artists
People from Kingston, Jamaica
Jamaican emigrants to Tanzania